Amjad Abu Alala (born in Dubai) is a Sudanese film director and screenwriter, who was born and lives in the United Arab Emirates. He became internationally known for his first feature film You Will Die at Twenty in 2019. This film was the first entry ever to be submitted from Sudan for the Academy Awards in the 'Best International Film' category, but was not selected in the final stage. His film has won, however, awards at international film festivals and has been shown internationally.

Life and career 
Abu Alala was born in the United Arab Emirates of Sudanese parents and grew up in Dubai. He studied media and communication science at Emirates University and then made his first documentaries for several Arab and Western TV stations. He has also directed four short films until 2019.

For his first feature film, Abu Alala turned to Sudan. His parents are both from Wad Madani in eastern Sudan, and he wanted to explore his roots. Searching for a story, suitable not only for a Sudanese audience, but also for viewers all over the world, he chose a short story by Sudanese writer Hammour Ziada from 2014. 

His feature film You Will Die at Twenty was presented and awarded at the Venice International Film Festival in August 2019 as part of the 'Venice Days''' competition. In September 2019, it was also screened at the Toronto Film Festival.

By coincidence, the film was shot at the time of the Sudanese revolution against Omar al-Bashir, who was overthrown by the military during demonstrations in April 2019 after having ruled the country for almost 30 years. This meant great challenges for the entire crew, not only because of governmental restrictions, but because there was no film industry in Sudan and they had to fly in several tons of equipment that they needed for the shooting.

As a producer, Abu Alala founded a creative laboratory in collaboration with the Doha Film Institute and produced five short films.

In 2013, Abu Alala won the Best Arabic Theatre Script Award for his script ‘Apple Pies’. Promoting Sudanese films, he has also been involved in the selection for the Sudan Independent Film Festival in Khartoum and the Arab Film Institute.

In 2021, he was selected as a jury member for the First feature section of the 74th Locarno Film Festival to be held from 4 to 14 August.

 Filmography 

 2004: Coffee and Oranges (short film)
 2005: Birds’ Feathers (short film)
 2009: Teena (short film)
 2012: Studio (short film)
 2019: You Will Die at Twenty, feature film

 Awards 
El Gouna Film Festival, Egypt, 2019

 Golden Star in the section for Narrative Competition: You Will Die at TwentyVenice Film Festival 2019

 Lion of the Future Award for best debut feature film: You Will Die at Twenty''

See also 

 Cinema of Sudan

References

External links 
 
Interview with Amjad Abu Alala and excerpts of his film "You will Die at Twenty" In German with English subtitles on YouTube

Sudanese film producers
Sudanese screenwriters
Sudanese artists
Sudanese film directors
Year of birth missing (living people)
Living people